Mao Ning (born 1972) is a Chinese politician and diplomat who has been serving as Deputy Director of the Foreign Ministry Information Department and a spokesperson of the Ministry of Foreign Affairs. 

Mao is the 33rd spokesperson since the position was established in the ministry back in 1983. She has engaged in diplomatic work for 27 years and mainly worked in Asian affairs.

Early life and education
Mao Ning was born in Xiangtan, Hunan province in 1972. It was reported that she is from the same clan of Mao Zedong according to the genealogy book.

Mao received a Bachelor of Arts with a major in English from Hunan Normal University in 1993, a Bachelor of Law with a major in diplomacy from China Foreign Affairs University in 1995, and a Master of International Policy and Practice from George Washington University in 2006.

Career
Mao joined the Foreign Service in August 1995 and has served primarily in the Asia Department of the Ministry of Foreign Affairs. She was deputy secretary-general of the Trilateral Cooperation Secretariat in May 2011, and held that office until May 2013, when she was appointed counsellor of the Chinese Embassy in the United States. She was recalled to the original department in November 2015, and was eventually promoted to deputy director in November 2017.

She was chosen as vice mayor of Leshan in June 2020 and was admitted to member of the Standing Committee of the CCP Leshan Municipal Committee, the city's top authority. 

On 5 September 2022, she became a spokesperson of the Foreign Ministry.

In January 2023, after some countries imposed PCR testing on those flying from China, Mao said "This lacks scientific basis and some practices are unacceptable" and China could "take countermeasures based on the principle of reciprocity."

References

1972 births
Living people
People from Xiangtan
Hunan Normal University alumni
China Foreign Affairs University alumni
George Washington University alumni
Central Party School of the Chinese Communist Party alumni
People's Republic of China politicians from Hunan
Chinese Communist Party politicians from Hunan
Spokespersons for the Ministry of Foreign Affairs of the People's Republic of China
Political office-holders in Sichuan
Chinese expatriates in the United States